was a Japanese seinen manga magazine edited by Broccoli, published by Flex Comix, and sold through Soft Bank Creative. The magazine is sold bimonthly on even-numbered months on the twenty-first. The magazine was originally published in April 2003 under the title , after the series Di Gi Charat published by Broccoli Books. The magazine was suspended in July 2004, but restarted publication in October 2004 under the new title  and was sold bimonthly as a special edition version of Comic Rush. The title was changed again in October 2005 to simply , and lasted for two issues until the title was changed a final time to the current Comi Digi + on April 21, 2006. The final issue was released 21 August 2008.

Despite being targeted toward seinen audiences, it is composed of girly manga.

Serialized titles
Chitose ga Iku!
Chitose Meshi Mase
Clannad
Gema Gema Gekijō Di Gi Charat
Ekorōgu 46
Emiru Miracle
Fushigi no Kuni no Mint-chan
Galaxy Angel
Galaxy Angel 3rd
GGBG!
Gokukō Kōshinkyoku
Hokke Mirin no Hi
Idol Tantei Akari
Kamichama Karin +
Koi Cupid
Kon Kon Kokon
Majiponi!
Mimitsuki G.A. Double Neko Maid
Miracle Twin Star
Piyo Piyo Piyoko-chan
Princess Concerto
True Tears
Yoki Koto Kiku

External links
Official website 

2003 establishments in Japan
2008 disestablishments in Japan
Defunct magazines published in Japan
Bi-monthly manga magazines published in Japan
Magazines established in 2003
Magazines disestablished in 2008
Seinen manga magazines
Flex Comix manga